The Somali passport is a somalia passport issued to citizens of Somalia for international travel. Green Passports were formerly used, which have since been replaced with biometric passports to ensure authenticity. The passports are regulated by the federal government of Somalia.

Overview

Somalia's former socialist government originally used to issue a non-biometric Green Passport. This travel document still remained in use after the collapse of former President Siad Barre's regime.

In response to widespread counterfeit Somali passports that subsequently flooded the black market, the Transitional National Government opened a new office in the 2000s to issue official state-approved passports. According to then Foreign Affairs Minister Muhammad Mahmud Shiil, the government would continue issuing old Somali passports with a new dry seal to prevent forgery or duplication, and passports already in circulation would a stamp with the new seal. The government announced in 2006 that it would issue a new machine-readable document to further ensure authenticity.

Since 2007, the Transitional Federal Government (TFG) of Somalia has issued an e-passport to comply with stricter international rules. In November 2010, the TFG opened a new passport-making facility in Mogadishu, the nation's capital. Printing of the travel documents had previously been conducted in the United Arab Emirates, which reportedly engendered a backlog in passport issuance. The repatriated printing facilities are believed to offer a more responsive passport delivery process. Officially issued by the Somali Immigration Department, the passports now contain built-in security features comparable with other countries.

In September 2011, the Transitional Federal Government officially banned use of Somalia's old Green Passport. According to Somali Immigration Officer, General Abdulaahi Gaafow Mohamoud, the identification document would no longer be accepted for business trips or travel by the end of the month. He added that the Green Passport would be replaced with a new blue model of e-passports that are particularly difficult to forge.

In December 2013, the Deputy Director-General of Somali Immigration and Naturalization Abdullahi Hagi Bashir Ismail announced that the Federal Government officially launched Somalia's new e-passport. Part of a broader initiative to strengthen security, the passport is issued by the Ministry of Interior's Department of Immigration. Citizens are eligible for the e-passport upon production of government-issued national identity documents and birth certificates.

The Somali passport is not considered as valid travel document by Canada. Canada considers any passport issued by Somalia as unreliable document.

Visa requirements

As of 1 January 2017, Somali citizens had visa-free or visa on arrival access to 30 countries and territories, ranking the Somali passport 100th in terms of travel freedom according to the Henley visa restrictions index.

See also
Visa policy of Somalia
Visa requirements for Somali citizens

References

External links

Passports by country
Government of Somalia